Toby Henshaw was the Archdeacon of Lewes  from 1670 until his death in 1681.

Henshaw was from Sussex and educated at Clare College, Cambridge.  He was ordained in 1672 and held the livings at Henfield and Cuckfield. He was Treasurer of Chichester Cathedral from 1672 to his death.<ref>"The Gentleman's Magazine, Volume 79" Sylvanus Urban (Edward Cave) p117 Henshaw was buried at Cuckfield on 25 November 1681.

References

Archdeacons of Lewes
Alumni of Clare College, Cambridge
17th-century English Anglican priests
1681 deaths
People from Cuckfield